New Year is a 1989 Indian Malayalam-language film directed by Viji Thampi. It is a remake of the 1985 Hindi film Aitbaar, which in turn was based on Dial M for Murder. The film stars Suresh Gopi, Urvasi, Jayaram, Silk Smitha and Sukumaran.

Plot 
The film begins with Menon travelling in a taxi. The car engine overheats and the driver gets out of the car to investigate. Menon gets out of the car, and is murdered by the driver.

Flashback
Ajith is Menon's nephew who is in love with Menon's daughter, Rekha. Ajith gets a job in the military which Menon disallows. Ajith takes the job despite Menon's disapproval and leaves town. A new suitor named Vinod appears, and he soon becomes Menon's favourite. Menon arranges the marriage of Rekha to Vinod, despite her disapproval. Vinod is a selfish criminal who wants to take Menon's property. He has a girlfriend named Daisy who is a dancer.

Present
Later, it is revealed that Vinod was the one who hired Robert to kill Menon when he learns of his deeds. Ajith is transferred to Ooty and visits Rekha. Seeing her predicament, he feels pity. After he leaves, Ajith writes a letter to Rekha to tell her that he still loves her. Rekha hides the letter from Vinod but Vinod finds it causing her to start doubting Rekha. Vinod and Rekha go shopping and Rekha misplaces her handbag. Knowing that the handbag contains Ajith's letter, Rekha rushes to retrieve it where she finds another letter asking for 50000 Rs in return of the letter. Rekha leaves the money in a lift as told in the letter, but does not gets her letter back. After this incident, Vinod confirms Rekha's affair. He hires Robert again to kill Rekha by showing him the pictures taken by him when he killed Menon. Robert enters the house on New Year's Eve when Ajith and Vinod go to a party. Robert attacks Rehka and she kills him with a pair of scissors. Rehka is found guilty of murder, for which she is sentenced to 14 years in prison. Upon reflection, the Circle Inspector doubts Vinod's story and raids the house. He finds the photographs and shows them to Rekha and Ajith. When Vinod discovers that he is caught, he kills himself.

Cast 
Suresh Gopi as Vinod Menon
Urvashi as Rekha
Jayaram as Ajith
Sukumaran as Circle Inspector Stephen
Siddique as Sub Inspector Salim
Babu Antony as Robert
Thilakan as Adv. Mathew Peter
Prathapachandran as Menon
Innocent as Pappan
Silk Smitha as Daisy
Valsala Menon as Ajith's mother
Kunchan as Chandran, Police Constable
James as Babu, Police Constable
Ravi Menon as Advocate Ganeshan
Viji Thampi as cameo appearance

References

External links 
 

1980 films
1980s Malayalam-language films
1989 films
Malayalam remakes of Hindi films
Indian crime thriller films
Films about contract killing in India
Films directed by Viji Thampi